Miltochrista convexa is a moth of the family Erebidae. It was described by Wileman in 1910. It is found in Taiwan and China.

The wingspan is 20–30 mm. Adults have been recorded on wing in April.

References

 Natural History Museum Lepidoptera generic names catalog

convexa
Moths described in 1910
Moths of Taiwan
Moths of Asia